Songming railway station is a railway station of Hangchangkun Passenger Railway located in Yunnan, People's Republic of China.

References

Railway stations in Yunnan
Railway stations in China opened in 2016
Transport in Kunming